Czyżew is a town in Podlaskie Voivodeship, north-eastern Poland.

Czyżew may also refer to the following villages in Poland:

Czyżew, Masovian Voivodeship
Czyżew, Greater Poland Voivodeship
Czyżew Kościelny
Czyżew Ruś-Kolonia
Czyżew Ruś-Wieś
Gmina Czyżew